Mary Ann Respall Blanch-Roxas (born June 18, 1941), better known by her screen name Marita Zobel, is a Filipina actress. She was an LVN Pictures contract star.

Filmography

Film

Television

References

External links

1941 births
Living people
ABS-CBN personalities
Actresses from Iloilo
Filipino child actresses
Filipino film actresses
Filipino people of Spanish descent
Filipino television actresses
People from Iloilo City
San Beda University alumni
Visayan people